The Union of Islamic Student Societies also known as the Islamic Society of Students is an Iranian student organization.

The organization is officially affiliated with the conservative alliance Front of Followers of the Line of the Imam and the Leader. It is close to Student Basij Organization and is known for containing the influence of Islamic Association of Students and Office for Strengthening Unity.

Student Justice-Seeking Movement and Independent Islamic Association of Students are similar organizations.

References 

Principlist political groups in Iran
Student political organisations of Iran
Student organizations established in 1989